Brothel creepers, sometimes shortened to creepers, are a style of shoe that has thick crepe soles, often in combination with suede uppers. This style of footwear became fashionable in the years following World War II, seeing resurgences of popularity at various times since then.

History and origins of the name
A version of this style of shoe became popular with World War II soldiers in North Africa, who adopted suede boots with hard-wearing crepe rubber. Writing in The Observer in 1991, John Ayto put the origin of the name 'brothel creeper' to the wartime years. The Smithsonian suggests the crepe in the thick sole may have given the shoes the title creeper. It may also be associated with a Ken Mackintosh dance tune popular in 1953 and called "The Creep".

This style of thick soled shoe was first developed commercially in 1949 by George Cox Limited of Wellingborough, Northamptonshire, UK, and marketed under the "Hamilton" name, based on George Cox Jr.'s middle name. Initially they came in shades of blue, ranging from pastel shades to electric blue, and were made of suede or polished leather. Later, more extravagant patterned versions were created.

Teddy Boys

The shoes were taken up by the Teddy Boys– along with drainpipe trousers worn with exposed socks and drape jackets. The shoes were also widely worn by the Ton-Up boys of the 1950s and later on the rockers of the '60s, who wore them as an alternative shoe when not riding their motorbikes.

The stilyagi (Russian: стиляги) youth subculture in the Soviet Union of the mid 1950s adopted home-made brothel creepers as footwear, dubbing them "shoes on semolina" (ботинки на манной каше) alluding to the sponginess of the thick crepe sole.

Punk, Rock and later revivals
The brothel creeper regained popularity in the early 1970s when Malcolm McLaren sold them from his "Let it Rock" shop in London's King's Road.

Then later in the early 1980s when NaNa's of Los Angeles manufactured and sold them from their shop in Santa Monica. Teddy Boys were the obvious customers, but the brothel creeper still proved to be popular among regular customers when McLaren and his partner Vivienne Westwood changed the shop to more rocker-oriented fashion.

The shoe has since been adopted by subcultures such as indie, ska, punk, new wavers, psychobilly, greasers and goth, Japanese Visual Kei, and was worn by Bananarama, The Cure frontman Robert Smith and Saffron, singer of Republica.

Since 2011 popular artists such as Miley Cyrus, Carly Rae Jepsen and Yungblud have been seen wearing them.

Puma Creepers by Rihanna
In 2015, Puma and Rihanna launched a collaborative shoe line called the Puma Creeper, which won an award for Shoe of the Year in 2016.

References

Rockabilly
Youth culture in the United Kingdom
Shoes